2017 census may refer to:

Alberta municipal censuses, 2017
2017 Census of Pakistan
2017 Peru Census